The Progressive National Baptist Convention (PNBC), incorporated as the Progressive National Baptist Convention, Inc., is a mainline predominantly African-American Baptist denomination emphasizing civil rights and social justice. The headquarters of the Progressive National Baptist Convention are in Washington, D.C. Since its organization, the denomination has member churches outside the United States, particularly in the Caribbean and Europe. It is a member of the National Council of Churches and the Baptist World Alliance.

History
The Progressive National Baptist Convention formed in 1961 after civil-rights-oriented Baptist ministers, led by Martin Luther King Jr., failed to replace Joseph H. Jackson, the long-time head of the National Baptist Convention (NBC USA). The older group stood aloof from the civil rights movement which was often led by local Baptist ministers; the National Baptist Convention (NBC USA) often preached spiritual salvation rather than political activism. The dissidents nominated Gardner C. Taylor as president of the NBC USA.  After a fist fight between reformers and stand-patters, in which one elderly minister was accidentally killed, Jackson's supporters won. King was ousted from the NBC USA and his goal of using the united power of the black Baptist community to promote civil rights came to nothing. His defeat prompted the formation of the new predominantly African American Baptist denomination.

Thirty-three delegates from 14 states gathered at Zion Baptist Church in Cincinnati to discuss the issue. The vote to organize passed by one vote. L. Venchael Booth, pastor of Zion Baptist in Cincinnati, was the unheralded founder of the movement as documented by former Christianity Today associate editor Edward Gilbreath. The convention was originally formed as the "Progressive Baptist Convention" and word "National" was added to the name in 1962. The convention has grown from the original founding numbers to member congregations throughout the United States, the Caribbean, Europe and Africa.

Following a path of political activism, the Progressive National Baptist Convention supported groups such as the National Association for the Advancement of Colored People (NAACP) and methods such as affirmative action. Famous civil rights leaders who were members of the PNBC include Martin Luther King Jr., Benjamin Mays, Ralph Abernathy, Wyatt Tee Walker, and Gardner C. Taylor. The Progressive National Baptist Convention bills the "progressive concept" as "fellowship, progress, and peace."

The Progressive National Baptist Convention celebrated its 50th Annual Session in Washington, D.C., in August 2011. The PBNC has partnered with the predominantly white mainline American Baptist Churches in the US since 1970.

In 1995, one study asserted the convention had 741 affiliated churches, while another claimed they had over 2,500,000 members in 2,000 churches. A number of the churches are dually aligned with the National Baptist Convention (NBC USA) and American Baptist Churches in the USA. In 2020, the Baptist World Alliance reported the convention's membership declined to 1,500,000 members in 1,362 churches.

In 2022, the Progressive National Baptist Convention elected Jacqueline A. Thompson as second vice president, which made her the first woman to hold an elected leadership role in the Progressive National Baptist Convention.

Beliefs
The Progressive National Baptist Convention recognizes the ordination of women, a practice not widely followed by Baptist groups. Likewise, the Progressive National Baptist Convention allows locally autonomous congregations to determine policy regarding same-sex marriages, and the PNBC has not taken an official stance on the issue, leaving room for diversity of opinion.

See also
 Christianity in the United States

Notes

Further reading
 William Booth, A Call to Greatness: The Story of the Founding of the Progressive National Baptist Convention, 
 Gilbreath, Edward, The Forgotten Founder, Christianity Today, Vol. 46, No. 3, 11 March 2002
 Albert W. Wardin, Jr., Baptists Around the World, 
 Bill J. Leonard, editor, Dictionary of Baptists in America, 
 Frank S. Mead, Samuel S. Hill, & Craig D. Atwood, Handbook of Denominations, 
 National Council of Churches, Yearbook of American and Canadian Churches

External links
Official website

Historically African-American Christian denominations
Baptist denominations in the United States
Members of the World Council of Churches
Christian organizations established in 1961
Baptist denominations established in the 20th century
Members of the National Council of Churches
1961 establishments in Ohio